Rowan James Brassey  (born 18 January 1956) is a former New Zealand international lawn and indoor bowls player.

Bowls career
An earth-moving contractor by trade, Brassey's first national success was the 1980 New Zealand Open Pairs. He went on to win eight New Zealand National Bowls Championships titles in the pairs (1982) and the fours (1981, 1982, 1990, 1995, 2002, 2003 & 2012/13) when bowling for the Okahu Bay, Avondale and Cabramatta Bowls Clubs respectively.

Brassey has competed at five World Bowls Championships, 1984, 1988, 1992, 1996 & 2000; winning gold in 1988 (pairs, with Peter Belliss), and in 2000 he won the gold medal with Andrew Curtain and Peter Belliss in the men's triples at the 2000 World Outdoor Bowls Championship in Johannesburg.

He has competed at six Commonwealth Games: 1982, 1990, 1994, 1998, 2002 and 2006. 

In 1990, Brassey was awarded the New Zealand 1990 Commemoration Medal. In the 2001 New Year Honours, he was appointed a Member of the New Zealand Order of Merit, for services to bowls.

He won eight medals at the Asia Pacific Bowls Championships including three gold medals.

In 2013, Brassey was an inaugural inductee into the Bowls New Zealand Hall of Fame.

References

 1998 New Zealand Commonwealth Games Team (Official book, 1998)

External links
 
 

1956 births
Living people
New Zealand male bowls players
Commonwealth Games medallists in lawn bowls
Commonwealth Games silver medallists for New Zealand
Commonwealth Games bronze medallists for New Zealand
Bowls players at the 1982 Commonwealth Games
Bowls players at the 1990 Commonwealth Games
Bowls players at the 1994 Commonwealth Games
Bowls players at the 1998 Commonwealth Games
Bowls players at the 2002 Commonwealth Games
Bowls players at the 2006 Commonwealth Games
Members of the New Zealand Order of Merit
Bowls World Champions
20th-century New Zealand people
21st-century New Zealand people
Medallists at the 1982 Commonwealth Games
Medallists at the 1990 Commonwealth Games
Medallists at the 1994 Commonwealth Games